Mother Albania may refer to:
Mother Albania (statue)
Mother Albania (poem) by Dritëro Agolli
Mother Albania (opera) by Avni Mula